Þorlákshafnarprestkall is a Lutheran (Church of Iceland) parish in southern Iceland, located within Árnessýsla. It is part of the Suðurprófastsdæmi (Southern Federation of Parishes).

Þorlákshafnarprestkall administrates three parish churches: Þorlákskirkja, Hjallakirkja, and Strandarkirkja, the latter two having been absorbed into the parish due to the lack of population within them.

External links 
 Þorlákshafnarprestkall at the Church of Iceland

References 

Southern Region (Iceland)
Church of Iceland